Commercial mortgage-backed securities (CMBS) are a type of mortgage-backed security backed by commercial and multifamily mortgages rather than residential real estate.  CMBS tend to be more complex and volatile than residential mortgage-backed securities due to the unique nature of the underlying property assets. 

CMBS issues are usually structured as multiple tranches, similar to collateralized mortgage obligations (CMO), rather than typical residential "passthroughs." The typical structure for the securitization of commercial real estate loans is a real estate mortgage investment conduit (REMIC), a creation of the tax law that allows the trust to be a pass-through entity which is not subject to tax at the trust level.

Many American CMBS transactions carry less prepayment risk than other MBS types, thanks to the structure of commercial mortgages. Commercial mortgages often contain lockout provisions (typically a period of 1-5 years where there can be no prepayment of the loan) which they can be subject to defeasance, yield maintenance and prepayment penalties to protect bondholders. European CMBS issues typically have less prepayment protection. Interest on the bonds may be a fixed rate or a floating rate, i.e. based on a benchmark (like LIBOR/EURIBOR) plus a spread.

Organization
The following is a descriptive passage from the "Borrower Guide to CMBS" published by the Commercial Mortgage Securities Association and the Mortgage Banker's Association:

Commercial real estate first mortgage debt is generally broken down into two basic categories: (1) loans to be securitized ("CMBS loans") and (2) portfolio loans. Portfolio loans are originated by a lender and held on its balance sheet through maturity.

In a CMBS transaction, many single mortgage loans of varying size, property type and location are pooled and transferred to a trust. The trust issues a series of bonds that may vary in yield, duration and payment priority. Nationally recognized rating agencies then assign credit ratings to the various bond classes ranging from investment grade (AAA/Aaa through BBB-/Baa3) to below investment grade (BB+/Ba1 through B-/B3) and an unrated class which is subordinate to the lowest rated bond class.

Investors choose which CMBS bonds to purchase based on the level of credit risk/yield/duration that they seek. Each month the interest received from all of the pooled loans is paid to the investors, starting with those investors holding the highest rated bonds, until all accrued interest on those bonds is paid. Then interest is paid to the holders of the next highest rated bonds and so on. The same thing occurs with principal as payments are received.

This sequential payment structure is generally referred to as the "waterfall". If there is a shortfall in contractual loan payments from the Borrowers or if loan collateral is liquidated and does not generate sufficient proceeds to meet payments on all bond classes, the investors in the most subordinate bond class will incur a loss with further losses impacting more senior classes in reverse order of priority.

The typical structure for the securitization of commercial real estate loans is a real estate mortgage investment conduit (REMIC). A REMIC is a creation of the tax law that allows the trust to be a pass-through entity which is not subject to tax at the trust level. The CMBS transaction is structured and priced based on the assumption that it will not be subject to tax with respect to its activities; therefore, compliance with REMIC regulations is essential. CMBS has become an attractive capital source for commercial mortgage lending because the bonds backed by a pool of loans are generally worth more than the sum of the value of the whole loans. The enhanced liquidity and structure of CMBS attracts a broader range of investors to the commercial mortgage market. This value creation effect allows loans intended for securitization to be aggressively priced, benefiting Borrowers.

Properties and classification 
Mortgage-backed securities can be distinguished by the type of real estate behind the collateral:

 Commercial MBS (CMBS)
These are collateralized by commercial real estate (such as apartment complexes, retail and office buildings).
 Residential MBS (RMBS)
These are secured by private residential real estate.

The characteristics of Commercial MBS vary depending on the term. While the longer-term loans (5 years or longer) often have fixed interest rates and restrictions on early repayments, shorter-term loans (1-3 years) usually have variable interest rates and free early repayments.

Industry participants

Master servicer
The master servicer’s responsibility is to service the loans in the pool through to maturity unless the borrower defaults. The master servicer manages the flow of payments and information and is responsible for the ongoing interaction with the performing borrower.

Primary servicer (or sub-servicer)
(Also see primary servicer)
In some cases the borrower may deal with a primary servicer that may also be the loan originator or mortgage banker who sourced the loan. The primary servicer maintains the direct borrower contact, and the master servicer may sub-contract certain loan administration duties to the primary or sub-servicer.

Special servicer
(Also see special servicer)
Upon the occurrence of certain specified events, primarily a default, the administration of the loan is transferred to the special servicer.  Besides handling defaulted loans, the special servicer also has approval authority over material servicing actions, such as loan assumptions.

Directing certificateholder / controlling class / B-piece buyer
The most subordinate bond class outstanding at any given point is considered to be the directing certificateholder, also referred to as the controlling class.  The investor in the most subordinate bond classes is commonly referred to as the "B-piece buyer". B-piece buyers generally purchase the B-rated and BB/Ba-rated bond classes along with the unrated class.

Trustee
The trustee’s primary role is to hold all the loan documents and distribute payments received from the master servicer to the bondholders. Although the trustee is typically given broad authority with respect to certain aspects of the loan under the Pooling and Servicing Agreement (PSA), the trustee typically delegates its authority to either the special servicer or the master servicer.

Rating agency
There will be as few as one and as many as four rating agencies involved in rating a securitization. Rating agencies establish bond ratings for each bond class at the time the securitization is closed. They also monitor the pool’s performance and update ratings for investors based on performance, delinquency and potential loss events affecting the loans within the trust.

See also
Residential mortgage-backed security
Fixed income securities
Structured finance
Debt service coverage ratio

References

External links
 Testing the Efficiency of the Commercial Real Estate Market: Evidence from the 2007-2009 Financial Crisis paper by Otto Van Hemert, NYU Stern & AQR Capital Management
 Discovering Distressed Assets: Whole Loan Workouts and Recapitalization Opportunities CMBS analysis whitepaper by Benjamin Polen, Newman Real Estate Institute, Baruch College

Fixed-income securities
Structured finance
Mortgage-backed security

de:Mortgage_Backed_Securities#CMBS